The 2005 Bayern Rundfahrt was the 26th edition of the Bayern Rundfahrt cycle race and was held on 25 May to 29 May 2005. The race started in Kempten and finished in Neumarkt in der Oberpfalz. The race was won by Michael Rich.

General classification

References

Bayern-Rundfahrt
2005 in German sport